Luzula nivalis, commonly known as arctic wood-rush  or less commonly as snowy wood-rush (both names are used with or without hyphenation), is a species of perennial rush native to the North American Arctic and Northern Europe. It was described by Polunin (1940) as one of the most abundant, ubiquitous, and ecologically important of all arctic plants.

Taxonomy and naming
Luzula nivalis is classified under the section Thyrsanochlamydeae of the subgenus Luzula. It belongs to the genus Luzula of the rush family Juncaceae. With regards to the etymology of the binomial: the generic name Luzula could  come from the Italian lucciola ("to shine, sparkle") or the Latin luzulae or luxulae, from lux ("light"), inspired by the way the plant's hairs sparkle when wet with dew. Nivalis is Latin for snowy, snow-covered or snow-like.

The exact taxonomy of Luzula nivalis is a little confusing due to confusions over the naming of the taxon; the name L. arctica has frequently (though less occasionally in recent years) been applied this taxon, or it has been regarded as a separate species altogether. Elven et al. (2003) stated that "a number of authors (Hultén 1968, Böcher et al. 1968, Porsild and Cody 1980, Novikov 1990) have considered L. nivalis to be conspecific with L. arctica, but some of them (Hultén 1968, Böcher et al. 1968) have used the name L. arctica, while the others (Porsild and Cody 1980...) [have used] the correct name L. nivalis.".  Elven et al. (2003) also noted that L. campestris var. nivalis was widely considered to be conspecific with L. arctica. The current botanical consensus seems to be that lectotypification solves the issue and that L. arctica and L. nivalis should be regarded as the same species, with the name L. nivalis being chosen as this (derived from L. campestris var. nivalis) is the species's basionym and was used before L. arctica.

Description
L. nivalis has fibrous roots and ascending rhizomes, older plants have vertical stems either at ground level or underground; the plant base is straw-brown/pale castaneous brown in colour. The plant is subglabrous with erect, aerial stems and numerous alternate basal leaves. The leaf tips are obtuse, acuminate, involute, caducous and slightly swollen. Both the blade adaxial and abaxial surfaces are glabrous, with sparse, white, non-glandular hairs along the blade margins.

The inflorescence of Luzula nivalis is congested in a single, dark, many-flowered head 0.8–1.0 × 0.6–0.9 cm in size; between 5–60 small flowers can be found in each inflorescence. No pedicels are present. L. nivalis produces an ovoid-trigonous seed capsule with exceeding tepals; capsule segments are blackish brown and 2.1–2.3 × c. 1.2 mm. The seeds themselves are ellipsoidal, smooth, brown and 1.0–1.2 × 0.6–0.7 mm in size. Basel appendages are fibrillate and up to 0.2 mm long. The fruit of L. nivalis is sessile and dry with a persistent and glabrous calyx.

The rosette-like whorl of short leaves in Luzula nivalis allows it to easily be distinguished from Luzula confusa.

Distribution and habitat
Luzula nivalis has an arctic-alpine circumpolar distribution, as L. nivalis is an alpine plant which grows in the arctic regions of the northern hemisphere. Places which L. nivalis grows in include Norway, Sweden, Finland, Svalbard, Greenland, northern Canada, and Alaska in the United States, as well as the Munni river in Siberia.

Luzula nivalis has been found in a wide range of mainly moist habitats and substrates, including wet meadows, snow patches, seepages, along the margins of ponds, marshes, streams (and other water bodies) as well as tundra, slopes and ridges. Occasionally L. nivalis has been found on dry sites including gravel, sand, silt, clay, till.

References 

nivalis
Flora of the Arctic
Flora of Northern Europe
Flora of North America
Plants described in 1822